Rosa Olga Sansom  (née Jensen; 3 June 1900 – 1 July 1989) was a New Zealand teacher, museum director, botanist, broadcaster and writer. She was a curator at Southland Museum and became the director of that museum in 1953. She was a founding member of the Ornithological Society of New Zealand. In 1979, she was awarded the Queens Service Medal.

Early life and education 
Sansom was born on at Halfmoon Bay, Stewart Island, New Zealand, in 1900. Her parents were Mary Elizabeth Leask and Newton Julius (Hans) Jensen, who was a fisherman and farmer. She was educated at Halfmoon Bay School, and then Southland Girls' High School, after which she was a probationary teacher at Waikiwi School in Invercargill. Sansom later taught at Longridge Village School and Menzies Ferry School.

Museum and botanical work 
Sansom became an honorary curator at the Southland Museum in June of 1948, having previously volunteered there. From March 1953 until 1959 she was director of the museum, making her New Zealand's first female museum director. As director, she was assisted by volunteers to develop displays on natural history, teach visiting school children, and identify biological specimens brought in by the public. 

Sansom collected botanical specimens that included seaweeds, alpine and bog plants, lichens and ferns over the course of more than 50 years. In 1956 she was invited to give the Banks Lecture on botany at the annual conference of the Royal New Zealand Institute of Horticulture. She was also a keen birdwatcher, and a founder member of the Ornithological Society of New Zealand.

Family 
Sansom gave up teaching when she married fellow teacher Arthur Borne Vickery on 13 May 1921 in Invercargill. The Vickerys had one daughter together but after her husband's sudden death in 1923 Sansom resumed teaching to support herself. Sansom later married Normal Francis Sansom on 9 April 1924 on Stewart Island. Sansom was a carpenter and then later a Presbyterian minister. They had two children, a daughter and a son. Sansom died in Lorneville, near Invercargill, on 1 July 1989.

Recognition 
In 1960 the Southland branch of the Royal Society of New Zealand made Sansom a life member, and the Southland Museum and Art Gallery did similarly in 1966. In 1973 she was included in the first edition of The World Who’s Who of Women.

In the 1979 New Year Honours, Sansom was awarded the Queen's Service Medal for community service.

In 2017, Sansom was selected as one of the Royal Society Te Apārangi's 150 women in 150 words.

Published work 
Sansom broadcast general talks about science on the radio and gave lectures for the Correspondence School. She wrote a monthly newsletter about Stewart Island for three years from 1962, and was a book reviewer and features writer for the Southland Times. Sansom's published work includes:

References

1900 births
1989 deaths
New Zealand schoolteachers
New Zealand curators
20th-century New Zealand botanists
Women botanists
20th-century New Zealand women scientists
People educated at Southland Girls' High School
New Zealand women curators
Women museum directors
New Zealand women botanists
Recipients of the Queen's Service Medal
People from Stewart Island
20th-century New Zealand women writers